Pülümür is a municipality (belde) and seat of Pülümür District, Tunceli Province, Turkey. It is populated by Kurds of the Arel and Keman tribes and had a population of 1,353 in 2021.

Notable people 

 Hüseyin Kenan Aydın

References

Populated places in Tunceli Province
Kurdish settlements in Tunceli Province
Towns in Turkey